Bucheon Hana 1Q is a South Korean women's professional basketball club based in Bucheon. They play in the Women's Korean Basketball League.

Honours

Women's Korean Basketball League 

WKBL Championship
 Winners (4): 1999 (winter), 2000 (summer), 2001 (summer), 2002 (winter)
 Runners-up (1): 1998 (summer)

WKBL Regular Season
 Winners (4): 1999 (winter), 2000 (summer), 2001 (winter), 2001 (summer)
 Runners-up (3): 1998 (summer), 2002 (winter), 2003 (summer)

References

External links
 Official website 

Basketball teams established in 1998
1998 establishments in South Korea
Basketball teams in South Korea
Women's basketball teams in South Korea
Women's Korean Basketball League teams
Sport in Gyeonggi Province